A Scrap of Time and Other Stories, written by Ida Fink, is a collection of fictional short stories relating various characters to the Jewish experience of the Holocaust. Originally written in Polish, it was translated by Madeline Levine and Francine Prose. The novel won the first Anne Frank Prize, as well as the PEN/Book-of-the-Month Club Translation Prize. Published in 1987, this collection of stories illustrates the continuing effect of the Holocaust on the Jewish psyche.

Image donated by Northwestern University Press

Themes and motifs

 "Traumatized Language", an idea coined by Brinkley and Arsenault, is the idea that language can no longer be the same, as it was, before the experience of trauma, in particular, that of the Holocaust. This is because World War II has created a global effect on the world's psyche, and therefore, words have failed to express the terrors of such events. Even once such simple, romantic notions, like "tree", have taken on a sinister connotation. To a survivor, a tree may connote lynching, therefore the word has become traumatized. A Scrap of Time is filled with such traumatized language.
 "Life versus Death" is a key theme to understanding the Holocaust. In this collection, it relates to how the living become dead, before they are killed - meaning that the living, after losing all sense of hope, lose their will to live. They no longer continue to struggle, but rather follow instructions, as commanded, to their death.
 "Animals Being More Human the Humanity" is the idea that the animals are more human than the humans in Fink's stories. The SS soldiers act as brutal killers, void of humanity. The animals found in various stories, take on the role of protecting or guiding the Jewish victims. There are several references to the SS soldiers to being pigs.
 "Nature's Revolt, or the Refusal of Nature's Revolt" is the idea that though such terrible events are occurring everyday (in the novel) Nature continues as if nothing is wrong. Only once in the 165 pages of short stories is there a reference to Nature making a revolt (which in found in *). The other stories typically take place in the Spring time or in the Morning, when everything is becoming alive. The birds can be heard singing between the gunfire. Grass grows above and around the fallen bodies. The Natural world seems to exist outside of the war, but around the war at the same time. Metaphorically, since the war is man-made, it is of no concern to the natural world.

The list of short stories
The stories in the collection are as follows:

 A Scrap of Time
 The Garden That Floated Away
 Behind the Hedge
 '*****'
 A Dog
 Jean-Christophe
 The Key Game
 A Spring Morning
 A Conversation
 The Black Beast
 Aryan Papers
 Inspector von Galoshinsky
 The Pig
 Titina
 Night of Surrender
 The Tenth Man
 Crazy
 Jump!
 The Other Shore
 Splinter
 The Shelter
 Traces
 The Table

Film adaption
The short stories "A Conversation" and "A Spring Morning" were adapted into a 2008 film titled Spring 1941.

Footnotes

Polish short story collections
Books about the Holocaust
1987 short story collections